Merelbeke is a municipality located in the Flemish province of East Flanders, in Belgium. In 2021, Merelbeke had a total population of 24,779. The total area is 36.65 km².

References

External links

 
Webpage at Internet Archive

Municipalities of East Flanders
Populated places in East Flanders